Ah Mau is a surname. Notable people with the surname include:

Isaak Ah Mau (born 1982), New Zealand rugby league player
Leeson Ah Mau (born 1989), New Zealand rugby league player